The 2003–04 Russian Superleague season was the eighth season of the Russian Superleague, the top level of ice hockey in Russia. 16 teams participated in the league, and HC Avangard Omsk won the championship.

Regular season

Playoffs

External links
Season on hockeyarchives.ru

Russian Superleague seasons
1